Qayyum Nazar (1914 - 1989), was a prominent Urdu language poet from Pakistan.  Along with fellow Urdu poets Meeraji and Noon Meem Rashid, Nazar was a member of the Pakistani literary circle, Halqa-e Arbab-e Zauq. Nazar was born in Lahore in British Raj, India. He worked as a professor at the Government College, Lahore. He wrote many books of Urdu poetry, specializing in classical forms of poetry. His first published ghazal was printed in 1933. He represented the new wave of Urdu ghazals and was impressed by many classic Urdu poets, especially two other masters of the ghazal, Mir Taqi Mir, an 18th-century poet considered the founder of Urdu poetry, and Fani Badayuni, an earlier 20th-century Urdu poet.

He poetic work included Urdu ghazals, na`ats, and verses composed in Punjabi. His kulliyat, a compilation of Urdu poetry, was published in 1987 and is called "Qalb-O-Nazar kay Silsilay". Nazar lived his entire life in Lahore, but traveled frequently, and his poetry reflects his life, his appreciation of the natural world, and his travels.

References

1914 births
1989 deaths
Pakistani poets
Urdu-language poets from Pakistan
Academic staff of the Government College University, Lahore
20th-century poets